Air Marshal Kulwant Singh Gill, PVSM, AVSM, YSM, VM(G) was former Air Officer Commanding-in-Chief (AOC-in-C) of Central Air Command of Indian Air Force. Commissioned into the Flying Branch of the Indian Air Force in Dec 1977. In a career spanning three decades and six years, he has held instructional, directional and command appointments, including Commandant of the National Defence Academy.

Career
Air Marshal Kulwant Singh Gill was commissioned into the Flying Branch of the Indian Air Force in Dec 1977. In a career spanning three decades and six years, he has held instructional, directional and command appointments, including Commandant of the National Defence Academy. In 2014 he was appointed AOC-in-C of Central Air Command.

Before assuming the office of AOC-in-C of Central Air Command, Singh was the commandant of the National Defence Academy. He retired from service on 31 December 2015 after three decades of service. Air Marshal SBP Sinha, AVSM, VM succeeded him as the AOC-in-C.

Family
Air Marshal KS Gill is married to Ranjeet Gil, a homemaker. The couple have three children. The second child and their only son Shahbeg Singh Gill is a fighter pilot and was commissioned in the IAF into the Flying Branch.

Military awards and aecorations

References 

Indian Air Force air marshals
Commandants of the National Defence Academy
Living people
20th-century Indian military personnel
21st-century Indian military personnel
Recipients of the Param Vishisht Seva Medal
Year of birth missing (living people)
Recipients of the Vayu Sena Medal
Recipients of the Ati Vishisht Seva Medal
Recipients of the Yudh Seva Medal